Shahpur tehsil may refer to the following administrative units:
 Shahpur Tehsil, Pakistan, in Punjab, Pakistan
 Shahpur tehsil, Madhya Pradesh, in India
 Shahpur tehsil, Himachal Pradesh, in Kangra district, India
 Shahpur taluka, Karnataka, a taluka in Karnataka, India, with headquarters the city of Shahapur

See also 
 Shahapur taluka, in Maharashtra, India